The Astictopterini are a tribe in the Hesperiinae subfamily of skipper butterflies. As most Hesperiinae have not yet been assigned to tribes, more genera may be placed here eventually.

Species
Recognised genera in the tribe Astictopterini include:
 Aeromachus
 Artitropa Holland, 1896
 Astictopterus
 Ceratricula Larsen, 2013
 Dotta Grishin, 2019
 Eogenes Mabille, 1909
 Fresna Evans, 1937
 Fulda Evans, 1937
 Galerga Mabille, 1897
 Gorgyra Holland, 1896
 Halpe
 Hollandus Larsen and Collins, 2015
 Lennia Grishin, 2022
 Lissia Grishin, 2019
 Nervia Grishin, 2019
 Onryza
 Pithauria
 Thoressa
 Trida Grishin, 2022
 Xanthonymus Grishin, 2019

References

 
Butterfly tribes